Guincourt is a commune in the Ardennes department in northern France, in the former county of Vermandois. It lies just off the old road between Tourteron and Saint-Loup-Terrier.

Population

Personalities
Jean de Schulemberg (1597-1671), comte de Montejeux, a marshal of France, was born in the château.

See also
Communes of the Ardennes department

References

Communes of Ardennes (department)
Ardennes communes articles needing translation from French Wikipedia